Vitor Sapienza (December 16, 1933 – April 9, 2020) was a Brazilian politician and economist from the state of São Paulo.

Life

Sapienza had a degree in economics and countable sciences from the Pontifical Catholic University of São Paulo.

In 1962, he started working as an accountant for the State of São Paulo. During this period of time, he had an active role at the State of São Paulo accountant union, and held various posts such as president, Secretary and Council member.

In 1986, Sapienza successfully ran for a spot at the Legislative Assembly of São Paulo. His first term started in 1987 and finished in 1991.

After his first tenure as a State Deputy, Sapienza was re-elected five consecutive times, in the years of 1990, 1994, 1998, 2002 and 2006.

In 1993, he was elected by his peers as President of the Legislative Assembly of São Paulo and kept the position from 1993 to 1995.

In 1994, for a brief period of time, Sapienza was nominated Acting governor of the State of São Paulo.

At the elections of 2010 and 2014, he didn't get enough votes for re-election, but was nominated for State Deputy on both occasions due to vacancies in his political coalition.

Altogether, Sapienza held a total of eight tenures as a State Deputy.

Death

On April 9, 2020, Sapienza died at Hospital Sírio-Libanês in São Paulo, at the age of 86 due to complications brought on by COVID-19.

References

Members of the Legislative Assembly of São Paulo
Brazilian economists
Brazilian Democratic Movement politicians
1933 births
2020 deaths
Deaths from the COVID-19 pandemic in São Paulo (state)
People from São Paulo
Pontifical Catholic University of São Paulo alumni